Renewable energy  in the Czech Republic  describes the renewable energy related development in the Energy in the Czech Republic.

According to Eurostat, renewables share in the Czech Republic in 2009 was 5% of the energy mix in total (Mtoe) and 6% of gross electricity generation (TWh). The energy consumption by fuel included in 2009: 40% coal, petroleum 21%, gas 15%, nuclear 16% and renewables 5%. Most electricity was produced with coal (55%) and nuclear (33%).

Solar power 

Solar power capacity per capita was the second highest in the EU in 2010.

Solar thermal 
“Green savings” programme has supported the solar thermal.

Wind power

See also

Energy in the Czech Republic
Solar power in the Czech Republic
Renewable energy in the European Union
Renewable energy by country

References

External links